is a 1986 mecha original video animation. The story is of a Japanese teenage girl and a powered armor suit.

Plot
Teenager Hanegi Manami leaves to go to school, just as a helicopter delivers a powered armor for her grandfather. Known as Del Power X, it is designed specifically for Hanegi Manami

Voice actors	
Jouji Yanami as Tatsuemon Yanami
Ryo Horikawa as Yousuke Miyamoto
Takeshi Aono as Von Getzel
Banjou Ginga as Nick Jagger
Hiroko Emori as Suzie Willis
Hiromi Murata as Laura McLaren
Hiromi Tsuru as Hanegi Manami 
Masaya Onosaka as Horie
Mayumi Shou as Akise Hiroko
Yuki Sato as Mizumoto
Banjou Ginga
Kaneto Shiozawa
Ryo Horikawa

References

External links